Statistics of Kuwaiti Premier League in the 1981–82 season.

Overview
Al Arabi Kuwait won the championship.

References
RSSSF

1981–82
1981–82 in Asian association football leagues
1